José María Yazpik (born November 13, 1970) is a Mexican actor.

Biography 
Yazpik was born in Mexico City, the son of gynaecologist Jose Maria Meza and housewife Cristina Yazpik. He has two siblings, Carlos and Cristina. When Yazpik was a child, Meza decided to move the family to San Diego, California. He started a practice in Tijuana, which bordered the two countries. The family settled in La Jolla, a wealthy district of San Diego. After loans were taken out on the forecasted profits of the new practice, the two boys were enrolled at St. Augustine High School, an all-boys school directed by priests. Meza failed in his gynaecology business and on other financial investments. After a year, with the dollar increasing in value against the Mexican peso, the family had to move to Tijuana. Cristina had to take on work to support their income. Through loaned money, José María and his brother Carlos continued to attend school in San Diego.

Yazpik did not graduate from high school as he struggled academically, but his ability in sports saved him from expulsion. He was indecisive about what career to pursue. A teacher recommended that he participate in theatre school, as she had noticed his ability.  Although he liked theatre and realised that this was the only way he could truly express himself, Yazpik returned to Tijuana and began to study communication at the local branch of the Universidad Iberoamericana. Again, he struggled with his studies and left after three months. He enrolled in law at the University of Baja California, but also left as he realized it was not his passion.

Yazpik's first acting job came from a friend of his father, who produced the TV movie The Brute With the Angel of Death. He moved to Mexico City to study at the Centro de Educación Artística (CEA) of Televisa. Upon graduating he was offered minor roles in youth soap operas on Televisa, which he wanted to decline as they did not offer him the chance to really express himself. However, his exclusive contract with the station forced him to accept all the roles he was offered. He had his first major role on television in the soap opera The Dove in 1995, produced by José Rendón, which stopped production because of the death of its star actor Gerardo Hemmer.

In 1996, Yazpik acted in his second telenovela, Song of Love, produced by Luis de Llano Macedo, and in the film Última llamada, directed by Carlos Garcia Agraz. In 1997, he gained roles in television, playing a villainous youth in the telenovelas Pueblo chico, infierno grande and Ángela, both produced by José Alberto Castro.

Yazpik portrayed Mexican narcotics trafficker, Amado Carrillo Fuentes, in the third season of the Netflix drama Narcos (2017) and in all three seasons of Narcos: Mexico (2018-2021).

Personal life 
Yazpik is the father of a girl named Leonor, with Mexican actress Iliana Fox.

Filmography

Film 

Última llamada (1996) as Pizzarista
Talk to Her (2002) as Minor Role (uncredited)
The Blue Room (2002) as Roberto
Tiro de gracia (2003, Short)
Sin ton ni Sonia (2003) as Mauricio
Shot of Grace (2003)
Nicotina (2004) as Joaquin
Bad Education (2004) as Minor Role (uncredited)
Crónicas (2004) as Iván Suárez
Pata de gallo (2004, Short) as Executive
Voces inocentes (2004) as Uncle Beto
Sueño (2005) as Pancho
Las vueltas del citrillo (2006) as Jose Isabel
Solo Dios sabe (2006) as Jonathan
Matapájaros (2006, Short)
Un mundo maravilloso (2006) as Financial Advisor
Last Call (2006) as Pizzarista
Borderland (2007) as Zoilo
Por siempre (2007, Short)
La hora cero (2008, Short) as Lorenzo
The Burning Plain (2008) as Carlos
Beverly Hills Chihuahua (2008) as Vasquez
Just Walking (2008) as Felix
Abel (2010) as Anselmo
El atentado (2010) as Arnulfo Arroyo
Colosio: El asesinato (2012) as Andres Vazquez
Morelos (2012) as Ignacio López Rayón
El Santos vs. La Tetona Mendoza (2012) as Peyote Asesino (voice)
Tijuana, te amo (2012) as Anthony
I'm So Excited (2013) as Infante
No sé si cortarme las venas o dejármelas largas (2013) as Actor TvNovela
Fighting for Freedom (2013) as Oscar Salazar
The Obscure Spring (2014) as Igor / Husband
Mr. Pig (2016) as Payo
Everybody Loves Somebody (2017) as Daniel
The Future Ahead (2017)
Polvo (2019) as Chato
There Are No Saints (2022) as Neto Niente
"Providence" (2023)

Television 
The Dove (1995) as Angel
Song of Love (1996) as Swami
Pueblo chico, infierno grande (1997) as Sebastian Paleo "Bataan" (young)
Ángela (1998) as Rene Bautista Solórzano
Life in the mirror (1999) as Roman Mauricio Franco
All for Love (2000) as Matthew
Fidel (2002, TV Movie) as Camilo Cienfuegos
Heads or Tails (2002) as Armando Fisherman
Cries of death and freedom (2010) as Antonio Lopez de Santa Anna
Narcos (2017) as Amado Carrillo Fuentes
Narcos: Mexico (2018-2021) as Amado Carrillo Fuentes

External links 

Interview with José María Yazpik in Leopard: "José María Yazpik profile

1970 births
Living people
Mexican people of Lebanese descent
Male actors from Mexico City
Mexican male film actors
Mexican male television actors